Ruben Bemelmans was the defending champion but lost in the quarterfinals to Zizou Bergs.

Benjamin Bonzi won the title after defeating Constant Lestienne 6–4, 2–6, 6–4 in the final.

Seeds

Draw

Finals

Top half

Bottom half

References

External links
Main draw
Qualifying draw

Challenger La Manche - 1
2022 Singles